Patricia Tarabini and Javier Frana were the defending champions, but lost in third round to Rachel McQuillan and David Macpherson.

Rika Hiraki and Mahesh Bhupathi won the title, defeating Lisa Raymond and Patrick Galbraith 6–4, 6–1 in the final. It was the 1st and only Grand Slam Mixed Doubles title for Hiraki, and the 1st Grand Slam Mixed Doubles title for Bhupathi, in their respective careers. Bhupathi became the first Indian player to win a Grand Slam tournament.

Seeds
The seeded players are listed below. Rika Hiraki and Mahesh Bhupathi are the champions; others show the round in which they were eliminated.All seeds received a bye into the second round.

Draw

Finals

Top half

Section 1

Section 2

Bottom half

Section 3

Section 4

External links
 Official results archive (WTA)
1997 French Open – Doubles draws and results at the International Tennis Federation

Mixed Doubles
French Open - Mixed Doubles
French Open - Mixed Doubles
French Open by year – Mixed doubles